Happy Wars  is a free-to-play, online multiplayer, action tactical role-playing video game developed by Toylogic, available for Xbox One. It was originally released for the Xbox 360 on October 12, 2012 on the Xbox Live Arcade as its very first free-to-play title, and additionally for Microsoft Windows on May 28, 2014, but availability on the online marketplaces of these platforms and service to these platforms has since been discontinued as of December 17, 2018. The Xbox One version was released on April 24, 2015, and is now the only platform the game can be played on.

Gameplay
Happy Wars is a multiplayer online game, defined as a role-playing strategy game, although it also has a short story-driven single player campaign mode. The multiplayer mode consists of two teams of up to 15 players attempting to destroy the other team's castle while also defending their own.

As of September 3, 2014, an Xbox Live Gold account was required to play the game online; due to recent updates, the game now accepts regular Xbox Live members as well.

The players choose from one of three classes: the warrior, the mage, and the cleric. There are also subclasses, although the only ones implemented at the moment are the Warrior-type Berserker, the Mage-type Zephyr, and the Cleric-type Engineer. Each class has a base attack and other unique abilities that are available as the player gains new levels. Each class also has a unique "Team Skill", where players can gather teammates together to allow the casting player to use more powerful skills. The more players that aid in the use of the team skill, the more powerful the ability becomes.

The game also had items that can be purchased either through playing the game or through microtransactions that allow in-game items to be purchased with Microsoft Points. There are items in Happy Wars that can only be purchased with Microsoft Points. They are usually powerful items that can allow players to get a head start in the game.

Reception

The Xbox 360 version of Happy Wars received "mixed" reviews according to the review aggregation website Metacritic. IGN cited lack of players as a concern with the Xbox 360 version and that "Happy Wars went too far in the direction of accessibility with its few classes, lack of distinctive weaponry, and simple game modes." Official Xbox Magazine UK compared said console version to Awesomenauts, but noted that players who pay for additional content appear to have an advantage over other players.

Jason Venter of GameSpot said that the same console version was "difficult to recommend because of the game's matchmaking and connection issues." A content update was released in November that attempted to fix the connection issues and other small game fixes.

References

External links
 

Role-playing video games
Free-to-play video games
Multiplayer online games
Online-only games
Xbox 360 Live Arcade games
Xbox One games
Windows games
Multiplayer and single-player video games
Tactical role-playing video games
2012 video games
Video games developed in Japan
Video games set in castles